The Cypriot A1 Andrón is the name of the highest level handball league of Cyprus.

2016/17 Season participants

The following 6 clubs compete in A1 Andrón during the 2016–17 season.

A1 Andrón past champions

 1984 : KN Anthoupolis
 1985 : KN Anthoupolis (2)
 1986 : KN Anthoupolis (3)
 1987 : KN Anthoupolis (4)
 1988 : KN Anthoupolis (5)
 1989 : KN Anthoupolis (6)
 1990 : KN Anthoupolis (7)
 1991 : SPE Strovolos Nicosia
 1992 : SPE Strovolos Nicosia (2)
 1993 : SPE Strovolos Nicosia (3)
 1994 : SPE Strovolos Nicosia (4)
 1995 : SPE Strovolos Nicosia (5)
 1996 : SPE Strovolos Nicosia (6)
 1997 : SPE Strovolos Nicosia (7)
 1998 : SPE Strovolos Nicosia (8)
 1999 : SPE Strovolos Nicosia (9)
 2000 : SPE Strovolos Nicosia (10)
 2001 : SPE Strovolos Nicosia (11)
 2002 : SPE Strovolos Nicosia (12)
 2003 : SPE Strovolos Nicosia (13)
 2004 : SPE Strovolos Nicosia (14)
 2005 : European University Cyprus
 2006 : SPE Strovolos Nicosia (15)
 2007 : SPE Strovolos Nicosia (16)
 2008 : European University Cyprus (2)
 2009 : SPE Strovolos Nicosia (17)
 2010 : SPE Strovolos Nicosia (18)
 2011 : SPE Strovolos Nicosia (19) 
 2012 : European University Cyprus (3)
 2013 : European University Cyprus (4)
 2014 : SPE Strovolos Nicosia (20)
 2015 : European University Cyprus (5)
 2016 : European University Cyprus (6)
 2017 : European University Cyprus (7)
 2018 : European University Cyprus (8)
 2019 : Parnassos Strovolou (1)
 2020 : Parnassos Strovolou (2)
 2021 : Anorthosis Famagusta (1)

EHF coefficient ranking
For season 2017/2018, see footnote

33.  (31)  Serie A (3.50)
33.  (35)  GHR A (3.50)
35.  (33)  A1 Andrón (3.00)
36.  (38)  Divizia Națională (2.00)
36.  (39)  Super 8 (2.00)

References

External links
 Official website

A1 Andrón
Cyprus
Sports leagues established in 1984
1984 establishments in Cyprus